Bonab kabab  is a type of kebab that is made of ground mutton, onion, and salt. It is named after the city of Bonab in the region of Azerbaijan in northwestern Iran, where it is originated from, and is famous for its large size.

References

Iranian cuisine
Azerbaijani cuisine
Kebabs